Abhaipura Banger is a village in Mant Tehsil of Mathura district, Uttar Pradesh, near Mat Mula and Surir. The location code is 123803.

Geography

Demographics

Politics
Mant (Assembly constituency) is the Vidhan Sabha constituency. Mathura (Lok Sabha constituency) is the parliamentary constituency.

References
 

Villages in Mathura district